G 1/07 is a decision of the Enlarged Board of Appeal of the European Patent Office (EPO), which was issued on February 15, 2010. The Enlarged Board of Appeal notably decided that, under the European Patent Convention (EPC), 

References

External links 
 Decision G 1/07, 
 

G 2007 1
Surgery
2010 in case law
2010 in Europe